Mongol khanate or Mongolian khanate can refer to:

Khanate of the Khamag Mongol (10th century–1206)
Mongol Empire (1206-1368)
Yuan dynasty
Golden Horde
Chagatai Khanate
Ilkhanate
Northern Yuan dynasty (1368-1635)
Kara Del (c. 1389–1513)
Kalmyk Khanate (1630-1771)
Dzungar Khanate (1634–1758)
Khoshut Khanate (1642-1717)
Mongolia (1911–24)

See also
Mongol dynasty (disambiguation)